Spider-Man: The New Animated Series (also known as Spider-Man or Spider-Man 2003 or MTV Spider-Man 2003  and MTV Spider-Man) is an American adult animated superhero television series that was the first of two shows based on the Marvel Comics character Spider-Man to be produced by Sony Pictures Television following their acquisition of the character's entertainment license. Initially intended to serve as a continuation of Sam Raimi's 2002 Spider-Man film, as well as a loose adaptation of the Ultimate Spider-Man comic books by Brian Michael Bendis, the show was made using computer generated imagery (CGI) rendered in cel shading. It ran for only one season of 13 episodes, premiering on July 11, 2003, and was broadcast on cable channels MTV in America and YTV in Canada.

The show is no longer considered canon to the events of Sam Raimi's Spider-Man film series, as events in the series were ultimately contradicted by the events of the first film's eventual follow-up, Spider-Man 2, released theatrically a year after this show's debut and cancellation.

Series overview 
Set shortly after the events of the 2002 film, Peter Parker, and his friends Mary Jane Watson, and Harry Osborn start attending Empire State University together. Peter and Mary Jane try to establish a relationship without much success. Peter's superhero duties, and later his involvement with Indira Daimonji, interfere with his romance with Mary Jane, while Harry continuously blames Spider-Man for the death of his father Norman Osborn. Peter faces an assortment of other villains including the Lizard, Kraven the Hunter and Electro while trying to maintain a job and his studies. He faces two psychic twins that ruin everything in the wallcrawler's life, causing Peter to give up being Spider-Man and try to live a normal life.

Cast and characters

Main characters 
 Neil Patrick Harris as Peter Parker / Spider-Man: A superhero who is also an Empire State University student and photographer for the Daily Bugle. Peter confronts with the desire to use his incredible, spider bite-derived powers to do good, he finds it hard balancing his responsibilities of being a superhero with schoolwork and his romance with Mary Jane Watson.
 Lisa Loeb as Mary Jane Watson: A student at Empire State University and model/actress. She is the on-and-off girlfriend of Peter Parker, but also seems to still hold some affection for Peter's alter-ego, Spider-Man, who she is unaware are both the same person.
 Ian Ziering as Harry Osborn: The son of the late industrialist Norman Osborn. He attends Empire State University along with his friends Peter Parker and Mary Jane Watson. Ironically, he blames Spider-Man for his father's death and seeks revenge, but is oblivious to the fact that his father was secretly the Green Goblin, and accidentally triggered his own death; however, as the series progresses, Harry has shown to warm up to Spider-Man, as well as helping him defeat Electro and accept being rescued from the Lizard.

Recurring characters 
 Keith Carradine as J. Jonah Jameson: The Daily Bugle newspaper publisher. Consistent with his appearances in the comics and films, Jameson spent most of his appearances berating Spider-Man and adding political spin to his activities, usually in front of Peter Parker. Jameson is so passionate about this that he even appears on a competitor's news broadcast to denounce Spider-Man.

Peter Parker's journalist girlfriend Indira "Indy" Daimonji was voiced by Angelle Brooks in seven episodes.

Guest characters 

 Stan Lee as Frank Elson: Appears in the penultimate episode "Mind Games". His character appeared for one scene in the next episode but did not have any dialogue, except grunts.
 Rob Zombie as Dr. Curt Connors / Lizard in the episode "Law of the Jungle".
 Eve as Cheyenne / Talon: A villain possibly based on Black Cat in the episode "Keeping Secrets".
 Kathy Griffin as Roxanne Gaines in the episodes "Mind Games" (Parts 1 and 2).
 Jeremy Piven as Roland Gaines in the episodes "Mind Games" (Parts 1 and 2).
 Michael Dorn as Kraven the Hunter in the episode "Mind Games" (Parts 1 and 2).
 Michael Clarke Duncan as Kingpin in the episode "Royal Scam". Duncan previously played the character in the Daredevil film.
 Keith David as FBI Agent Mosely in the episode "Royal Scam".
 Jeffrey Combs as Dr. Zellner in the episode "Flash Memory".
 Clancy Brown as Raymond (Richard Daimian's bodyguard) in the episode "Sword of Shikata".
 Virginia Madsen as Silver Sable in the episodes "Spider-Man Dis-Sabled" and "Mind Games" (Part 1).
 James Marsters as Sergei: The leader of a high-tech gang of mercenaries called Pterodax in the episodes "Tight Squeeze" and "Mind Games" (Part 1).
 Harold Perrineau Jr. as Turbo Jet: A villain possibly based on Rocket Racer or Blue Streak in the episode "Heroes and Villains".
 Ed Asner as Officer Bar in the episodes "Heroes and Villains", "Sword of Shikata", "Law of the Jungle" and "Mind Games" (Part 2).
 Gina Gershon as the ronin Shikata in the episode "Sword of Shikata".
 John C. McGinley as Richard Daimian in the episode "Sword of Shikata".
 Ethan Embry as Max Dillon / Electro in the episodes "Head Over Heels", "The Party" and "When Sparks Fly".
 Devon Sawa as Flash Thompson in the episode "Flash Memory".
 Tara Strong as Christina in the episode "Head Over Heels".
 Cree Summer as Professor Williams in the episodes "The Party" and "When Sparks Fly".
 Jeff Fischer as Doug Reisman in "Heroes and Villains" and "The Party".

Production

Development 
Spider-Man: The New Animated Series was initially supposed to be a direct adaptation of the Ultimate Spider-Man comics by Brian Michael Bendis, who also worked on the series' production and wrote the original unused pilot for Sony Pictures Entertainment, who had purchased the film and television rights to the character. However, after the success of Sam Raimi's 2002 Spider-Man film, the show was reworked to follow that continuity. The series was redeveloped by Morgan Gendel, best known as writer of the "Inner Light" episode of Star Trek: The Next Generation. Gendel, with the team of writers he hired, was given free rein by Sony to develop several original characters who fit in with the series' more adult tone, including Indira Daimonji, Shikata and the creepily telepathic Gaines Twins. The computer-generated imagery (CGI) was produced by Mainframe Entertainment.

Peter Parker was originally supposed to wear baggier clothes to hide his superhero musculature, but cost-effective difficulties with the CGI format prevented folds from being put into his everyday attire. As a result, Peter's street clothes were redesigned to be close-fitting and contemporary, while still managing to hide his physique (and the costume he wore under his clothes) as Spider-Man. The character of Aunt May was not included in the series (except for a photograph in Peter's bedroom), because MTV executives feared that the appearance of any elderly people would deter their target youth audience from watching.

The producers found that the more relaxed standards of MTV allowed them more creative freedom than usually allowed for a Saturday morning cartoon show.

Cancellation
MTV decided that, even though the ratings were high compared to other shows in the same time-slot, the series did not fit in with its other programming. Director Brandon Vietti stated that had the series gone on he would have used the villains Mysterio, Vulture, and more of Kraven.

Episodes
Due to various production delays, the episodes aired on MTV out of the correct scripted order. This caused some confusion with audiences regarding the chronology of the series. The DVD releases feature the episodes in the correct order. Each episode has a montage at the end of which states "Next Time On Spider-Man". The order given here is that of the DVD.

Reception 
The series received mostly positive reviews from critics and audiences, with praise aimed at the voice acting (particularly Harris), the mature tone, writing, animation and soundtrack, though it also received criticism from fans for its divergence from the sequel films to the 2002 film, most notably with the abrupt cliffhanger ending contradicting the events of the 2004 film Spider-Man 2.

In 2004, the series was nominated for an Annie Award for Outstanding Achievement in an Animated Television Production while "Keeping Secrets" got a nomination in Outstanding Storyboarding in an Animated Television Production.

Home media 
The complete series was released on DVD as Spider-Man: The New Animated Series: Special Edition on January 13, 2004. Four separate DVD volumes containing three episodes each were also released from 2004 to 2005. The entire series was licensed by Marvel and Sony to DigiKids/Sentimental Journeys, who re-edited the footage from many episodes into one feature, which is sold as a personalized DVD in which the purchaser's face is revealed under Spider-Man's mask.

The series was made available for streaming on Disney+ on October 19, 2022.

References

External links 

 
 Spider-Man: The New Animated Series @ Marvel Animation Age

2000s adult animated television series
2000s American animated television series
2000s Canadian animated television series
2000s American adult animated television series
2000s Canadian adult animated television series
2003 American television series debuts
2003 American television series endings
2003 Canadian television series debuts
2003 Canadian television series endings
American adult animated action television series
American adult animated adventure television series
American adult animated superhero television series
American adult animated science fiction television series
Canadian adult animated action television series
Canadian adult animated adventure television series
Canadian adult animated superhero television series
Canadian adult animated science fiction television series
Adult animated television shows based on Marvel Comics
American computer-animated television series
Canadian computer-animated television series
MTV cartoons
Television series about shapeshifting
Television series about teenagers
Animated Spider-Man television series
Animated television shows based on films
American sequel television series
Alternative sequel television series
Teen animated television series
Teen superhero television series
Television series by Sony Pictures Television
Television shows set in New York City
Television series by Adelaide Productions